Luis Parodi Valverde (12 August 1936 – 14 April 2020) was an Ecuadorian politician who served as Vice President.

References

1936 births
2020 deaths
Vice presidents of Ecuador